William Rutherford may refer to:
 Bill Rutherford, British professor of biochemistry
 Bill Rutherford (footballer), Scottish footballer
 Bill Rutherford (politician), Oregon politician
 William Gunion Rutherford (1853–1907), Scottish scholar
 William Rutherford (mathematician) (1798–1871), English mathematician
 William Rutherford (physiologist) (1839–1899), British physiologist
 Sir William Rutherford, 1st Baronet (1853–1927), British politician, MP for West Derby and Edge Hill
 Willie Rutherford (1945–2010), Australian football player

See also 
 William Gordon Rutherfurd (1765–1818), British naval officer
 William Rutherford Mead (1846–1928), American architect